The Malaya Kuonamka (Kıra Kuonamka) is a river in Yakutia (Sakha Republic), Russia.

The river flows north of the Arctic Circle, in the northern limits of the Central Siberian Plateau and the North Siberian Lowland. The area is very cold and desolate, devoid of settlements.    

The Kuonamka Formation is a Cambrian large igneous province in the northeastern Siberian platform.

Course  
The Malaya Kuonamka "Little Kuonamka" is the second largest tributary of the Anabar. In their last stretch both rivers flow roughly northwards. Finally they meet where the Anabar river proper begins,  from its mouth in the Laptev Sea.

The river is fed by rain and snow. It is frozen between late September and late May.

Fauna
The main fish species in the river are grayling, taimen and whitefish.

See also
List of rivers of Russia

References

External links 
Schematic map of ancient terrains and kimberlitic fields in the Siberian craton
Fishing & Tourism in Yakutia

Rivers of the Sakha Republic